Ribosomal protein S27 like is a protein that in humans is encoded by the RPS27L gene.

Function

This gene encodes a protein sharing 96% amino acid similarity with ribosomal protein S27, which suggests the encoded protein may be a component of the 40S ribosomal subunit. [provided by RefSeq, Jul 2008].

References

Further reading